Styloleptus is a genus of longhorn beetles of the subfamily Lamiinae. It was described by Dillon in 1956.

Species
 Styloleptus atrovittatus (Fisher, 1925)
 Styloleptus biustus (LeConte, 1852)
 Styloleptus brunneofasciatus (Fisher, 1935)
 Styloleptus caymanensis (Fisher, 1948)
 Styloleptus cubanus (Fisher, 1926)
 Styloleptus darlingtoni (Fisher, 1942)
 Styloleptus dozieri (Fisher, 1932)
 Styloleptus guilartensis (Micheli & Micheli, 2004)
 Styloleptus inermis (Fabricius, 1801)
 Styloleptus infuscatus (Fisher, 1932)
 Styloleptus laticollis (Fisher, 1925)
 Styloleptus lewisi (Fisher, 1948)
 Styloleptus nigricans (Fisher, 1935)
 Styloleptus nigrofasciatus (Gilmour, 1963)
 Styloleptus nigronotatus (Zayas, 1975)
 Styloleptus pilosellus (Fisher, 1942)
 Styloleptus planicollis (Fisher, 1935)
 Styloleptus posticalis (Gahan, 1895)
 Styloleptus rhizophorae Chemsak & Feller, 1988
 Styloleptus scurra (Chevrolat, 1862)
 Styloleptus taino Lingafelter & Micheli, 2004
 Styloleptus thompsoni (Fisher, 1948)
 Styloleptus variabilis (Fisher, 1925)
 Styloleptus zorrillai (Zayas, 1975)

References

 
Acanthocinini